

Events 
January 13 – American songwriter Stephen Foster ("Oh! Susanna", "Old Folks at Home") dies aged 37 in New York City leaving a scrap of paper reading "Dear friends and gentle hearts". His parlor song "Beautiful Dreamer" is published in March.
February 24 – Bedřich Smetana's symphonic poem Hakon Jarl is premiered in Prague.
February 29 – Composer Gioachino Rossini celebrates his 72nd (18th) birthday with a party.
May – Richard Wagner meets his new patron, the young Ludwig II of Bavaria, in Munich.
December 17 – Jacques Offenbach's operetta La Belle Hélène receives its first performance at the Paris Variétés
Hans von Bülow takes over from Franz Lachner at the Munich opera.
Mili Balakirev begins sketching his Symphony No. 1. It will not be performed till 1898.

Published popular music 

"Beautiful Dreamer" by Stephen Foster
"Der Deitcher's Dog" ("O Where, O Where Has My Little Dog Gone?") by Septimus Winner
"The Picture on the Wall" by Henry Clay Work
"Pretty Polly Perkins of Paddington Green" w. Harry Clifton m. traditional?
"Shall We Gather at the River?" w.m. Robert Lowry
"Somebody's Darling" w.m. John Hill Hewitt
"Tramp! Tramp! Tramp! (The Boys Are Marching)" by George F. Root

Classical music 
Gaetano Braga – Souvenir du Rhin
Johannes Brahms 
9 Lieder and Songs, Op.32
Piano Quintet  Op. 34
Anton Bruckner 
Mass No.1 in D minor, WAB 26
Herbstlied, WAB 73
Um Mitternacht, WAB 89
Aleksandr Dargomyzhsky – Kazachok
Félicien David – Allegretto agitato
Niels Gade – 3 Fantasie pieces for clarinet and piano, Op. 43
Hermann Goetz – Frühlings-Ouvertüre, Op.15
Louis Gottschalk – The Dying Poet
Ferdinand Hiller 
Operette ohne Text, Op.106
12 Lieder (Hiller Album), Op.111
Solomon Jadassohn – Symphony No.2, Op.28
Adolf Jensen 
Präludium und Romanze, Op.19
7 Gesänge aus dem spanischen Liederbuche, Op.21
6 Lieder, Op.24
Piano Sonata, Op.25
Friedrich Kiel – Piano Concerto
Heinrich Lichner – 3 Piano Sonatas, Op.4
William Mason – Ballade et barcarole, Op.15
Josef Gabriel Rheinberger – 5 Motets, Op.40
Ernst Rudorff – String Sextet, Op.5
Camille Saint-Saëns – Piano Trio No.1, Op.18
Franz Strauss – Nocturno for Horn and Piano
Peter Tchaikovsky – The Storm
Thomas Tellefsen – Trio for piano, violin and cello (Opus 31)
Stanislas Verroust – Solo de concert No.11, Op.85
Pauline Viardot – 12 Poems by Pushkin, Fet and Turgenev
Robert Volkmann – Symphony no. 2
Władysław Żeleński 
Valse-caprice, Op.9
2 Morceaux de salon, Op.11

Opera 
Daniel François Esprit Auber – La fiancée du roi de Garbe (premiered January 11 in Paris)
Flor van Duyse – Rosalinde (libretto by Karel Versnaeyen, premiered in Antwerp)
Charles Gounod - Mireille, opera premiered on March 19, in Paris
Karel Miry – Bouchard-d'Avesnes (opera in 5 acts, libretto by Hippoliet van Peene, premiered on March 6 in Ghent)
Jacques Offenbach – Die Rheinnixen (The Rhine Fairies)
George Alexander Macfarren – Helvellyn, (opera in 4 acts, libretto by John Oxenford, premiered on November 3 in London)

Musical theatre 
La Belle Hélène (Lyrics: Henri Meilhac & Ludovic Halévy Music: Jacques Offenbach) opens at the Théâtre des Variétés, Paris, on December 17.

Births 
February 6 – John Henry Mackay, lyricist (died 1933)
February 7 
Ricardo Castro, Mexican concert pianist and composer (d. 1907)
Arthur Collins, singer (d. 1933)
February 9 – Miina Härma, Estonian organist, composer, and conductor (d. 1941)
March 12 – Alice Tegnér, organist, composer (d. 1943)
April 10 – Eugen d'Albert, composer, pianist (d. 1932)
May 23 – Louis Glass, composer (d. 1936)
June 11 – Richard Strauss, composer, conductor (d. 1949)
July 6 – Alberto Nepomuceno, composer and conductor (d. 1920)
July 20 – Erik Axel Karlfeldt, lyricist (died 1931)
August 18 – Gemma Bellincioni, operatic soprano (d. 1950)
October 7 – Louis F. Gottschalk, composer (d. 1934)
date unknown – Alice Esty, operatic soprano (d. 1935)

Deaths 
January 13 – Stephen Foster, songwriter (b. 1826)
January 15 – Isaac Nathan, English-born composer and musicologist, "father of Australian music" (b. c.1791)
January 26 – Otto Lindblad, composer (b. 1809)
February 16 – Václav Jindřich Veit, lawyer and composer (b. 1806)
March 30 – Louis Schindelmeisser, clarinettist, conductor and composer (b. 1811)
May 2 – Giacomo Meyerbeer, composer (b. 1791)
June 3 – Anna Maria Sessi, opera singer (b. 1790)
July 28 – Johann Hermann Kufferath, composer (born 1797)
August 13 – Berthold Sigismund, lyricist (born 1819)
September 4 – Manuel Antonio Carreño, Venezuelan musician, teacher and diplomat (b. 1812)
October 1 – Christian Friedrich Ludwig Buschmann, musical instrument maker (b. 1805)
October 7 – Apollon Grigoryev, poet and songwriter (b. 1822) (alcoholism)
December 20 – Josef Proksch, pianist and composer (b. 1794)

References 

 
19th century in music
Music by year